Vathikuchi is a 2013 Indian Tamil-language action thriller film written and directed by newcomer P. Kinslin and produced by A. R. Murugadoss in association with Fox Star Studios. The film stars Dileepan, the younger brother of Murugadoss, in his acting debut and Anjali, while Jayaprakash, Sampath Raj and Jagan appear in supporting roles. The film, which has music composed by Ghibran, opened in March 2013 to a positive response from critics and performed well at the box office.

Plot
Sakthi is an autorickshaw driver, who is in love with his neighbor, Leena. His life changes when he runs into three dangerous criminals who want him dead.

Cast

Dileepan  as Sakthi
Anjali as Leena
Sampath Raj as Benny
Jayaprakash as Gangariya
Jagan as Vanaraj
Saranya Ponvannan as Sakthi's mother
Pattimandram Raja as Sakthi's father
Sathish as Karunamuthu
Ravi Mariya as Benny's friend
Sriranjini as Leena's mother
Vatsan Chakravarthy as Praveen
Akhil Kumar as Golicha
Rajashree
Angana Roy
Ravi
Bala Singh

Production
The film was first announced in January 2012, when it was revealed that Murugadoss's brother Dileepan would make his debut as an actor in a venture to be co-produced by Fox Star Studios. Murugadoss chose the film's title as reference to the song 'Vathikuchi Pathikadhuda...' from his first directorial venture Dheena.

After winning accolades for her performance as a chirpy young nurse in Engaeyum Eppothum, Anjali was signed up by producer A R Murugadoss for his second successive production. Impressed with M Ghibran's score in Vaagai Sooda Vaa, both Murugadoss and Kinslin decided to sign him on for the film.

Release
The satellite rights of the film were sold to STAR Vijay.

Critical reception
Vathikuchi received mixed to positive reviews from critics. Vivek Ramz from in.com rated it 3 out of 5 and stated that Vathikuchi is more brawny than brainy. He added that Director Kinslin shows promise in his debut film with different treatment for this somewhat clichéd story. His way of storytelling is realistic at times with very grounded level approach towards a common man issue. The problem with the film is that he has introduced too many characters and made few simple situations more complex which works at times and at other times backfired. Finally concluding that it's not a bad film at all and can be watched once! Tikkview.com gives 3/5 for Vathikuchi. and their review says that "Usual story line.We may seen this story in many movies.But narration style is really good." Indiaglitz says "Economic ride jarred by minor speedbrakers, yet reaches the destination on time!". Behindwood remained neutral with 2.5/5 saying "Vathikuchi has equal moments that will interest you as well as make you restless in your seat"

Soundtrack

The film's score and soundtrack are composed by Ghibran. The soundtrack was released on 13 February 2013, to positive reviews.

Indiaglitz.com gave 4 out of 5 and wrote that, "Even if this album is not a sensation, everybody is bound to carry the repertoire to their shower, and hum these numbers all through the day, for these songs, certainly leave a lasting impression. Four voices, four lyricists, few strings, some beats and keys, and one young man behind them all - this is yet another musical magic from Ghibran"

References

External links
 

2013 films
2010s Tamil-language films
Films scored by Mohamaad Ghibran
Fox Star Studios films